The Piano Concerto No. 3, W512, is a composition for piano and orchestra by the Brazilian composer Heitor Villa-Lobos, written in 1952–57. A performance lasts about 26 minutes.

History
Villa-Lobos began composing the Third Concerto in Rio de Janeiro in 1952, but interrupted work in favour of other commissions, completing it in New York only in 1957, five years after composing the Fourth Concerto and three years after completing the Fifth Concerto.

Instrumentation
The work is scored for solo piano and an orchestra consisting of piccolo, 2 flutes, 2 oboes, cor anglais, 2 clarinets, bass clarinet, 2 bassoons, contrabassoon, 4 horns, 2 trumpets, 2 trombones, tuba, timpani, percussion (tam-tam, cymbal, vibraphone), celesta, harp, and strings.

Analysis
The concerto has four movements:
Allegro non troppo 
Andante con moto 
Scherzo (Vivace) – Cadenza
Allegro vivace (decisivo)
The transparent, Aeolian main theme of the first movement recalls the openings of some of Sergei Prokofiev's concertos and the Third Piano Concerto of Béla Bartók. In general, the concerto is "athematic", avoiding characteristic melodies. The slow movement is an exception, with lyrical, clear themes.

Discography
 Heitor Villa-Lobos: 5 concertos para piano e orquestra. Fernando Lopes, piano; Orquestra Sinfônica Municipal de Campinas; conducted by Benito Juarez. Recorded 18–24 June 1984, in the Teatro Interno do Centro de Covivência Cultural da Campinas. LP recording, 4 discs: 12 inch, 33⅓ rpm, stereo. Energia de São Paulo: LPVL 01/25 – LPVL 04/25. São Paulo: Energia de São Paulo, [1984?].
 Heitor Villa-Lobos: Five Piano Concertos. Cristina Ortiz, piano; Royal Philharmonic Orchestra, conducted by Miguel Gómez-Martínez. Recorded at the Walthamstow Assembly Hall in October 1989, January and July 1990. 2-CD set: stereo. London 430 628-2 (430 629-2 and 430 630–2). London: The Decca Record Company Limited, 1992.
 Heitor Villa-Lobos: Cinco Conciertos para Piano y Orquesta. Elvira Santiago, piano (Concerto No. 1); Ulises Hernández, piano (Concerto No. 2); Patricio Malcolm, piano (Concerto No. 3); Harold López-Nussa, piano (Concerto No. 4); Roberto Urbay, piano (Concerto No. 5); Orquesta Sinfónica Nacional de Cuba, conducted by Enrique Pérez Mesa. Concerto No. 3 recorded at the Teatro Auditorium Amadeo Roldán, Havana, Cuba, 10 December 2003, as part of the XXV Festival Internacional del Nuevo Cine Latinoamericano. 2 CDs + 1 DVD. Colibrí DVD/CD 050. Havana: Colibrí, 2006.

References

Cited sources

Further reading
 Appleby, David P. 2002. Heitor Villa-Lobos: A Life (1887–1959). Lanham, Maryland: Scarecrow Press. .
 Fortes Filho, Raimundo M. de Melo. 2004. Concerto Para Piano e Orquestra n. 1 de Villa-Lobos: Um Estudo Analítico-Interpretativo. Masters thesis, Universidade Federal da Bahia.
 Johnson, Bret. 1992. "Villa-Lobos: Piano Concertos Nos. 1–5 by Cristina Ortiz, Miguel Gomez- Martinez". Tempo, New Series, No. 182, Russian Issue (September): 60–61.
 Peppercorn, Lisa M. 1984. Villa-Lobos's Commissioned Compositions.  Tempo, New Series, No. 151 (December), pp. 28–31.

1957 compositions
Compositions by Heitor Villa-Lobos
Villa-Lobos 3
Music with dedications